Hunger Artist may refer to:

Hunger artists, performance artists popular in the 1880s
"A Hunger Artist", a 1922 short story by Franz Kafka
A Hunger Artist (short story collection), a 1924 collection of short stories by Franz Kafka
The Hunger Artist (play), a 1987 Richard Greenberg play
"The Hunger Artist" (CSI episode), a 2002 episode of CSI

See also
"The Hunger Art", a 2008 opera based on Kafka's story
Hunger Artists Theatre Company, a California alternative theater group